Deacetylasperulosidic acid is an iridoid compound found in a few medicinal plants, such as Morinda citrifolia. Some in vitro and in vivo bioactivities of deacetylasperulosidic acid include anti-inflammatory, analgesic, anti-cancer, antioxidant, anti-arthritic, anti-mutagenic, anti-clastogenic, and hepatoprotection.

References

Iridoid glycosides
Cyclopentenes